The Mount Ledang National Park is a national park located in the Tangkak District, Malaysia. It contains the 1,276 m peak of Mount Ledang and was established in 2005, and now it is one of the most famous hiking goals in Johor. 

Mount Ledang is additionally steeped in legend. Many of the legends are centered round the mythical princess, Puteri Gunung Ledang.

About 160 species of birds have been recorded in the park.

See also
 List of national parks of Malaysia

External links
 Gunung Ledang – Johor National Parks

References 

National parks of Johor
Tangkak District